Kaposmérő is a village in Somogy county, Hungary.

External links 
 Street map (Hungarian)
 community Kaposmérő 7521.hu
 http://www.kaposmero.hu/

References 

Populated places in Somogy County